No Doy is the first commercial release by the American jam band moe. through a major label, Sony Music Entertainment. "Spine of a Dog" is a re-recording of a song that originally appeared on the first moe. album, Fatboy (with an a cappella intro) and "St. Augustine" is a re-recording of the song from Headseed (with much more prominent slide guitar). Several of the songs on this album, including "Buster", "Rebubula", "Moth", and "32 Things" have gone on to become cornerstones of the band's live-set rotation.

Track listing
"She Sends Me" (Schnier) – 3:56
"32 Things" (Schnier) – 6:26
"St. Augustine" (Derhak) – 3:44
"Bring You Down" (Schnier) – 3:49
"Rebubula" (Derhak) – 11:27
"Spine of a Dog" (Derhak, Garvey) – 3:48
"Moth" (Schnier) – 5:40
"Buster" (Derhak) – 8:34
"Four" (Garvey) – 10:50

Personnel 
moe.
Rob Derhak – electric bass, vocals
Chuck Garvey – guitar, vocals
Chris Mazur – drums, vocals
Al Schnier – guitar, vocals

Production
Nadine Hemy – coordination
Jesse Henderson – assistant engineer
Joe McGrath – engineer, mixing
Vladimir Meller – mastering
Brendan O'Neil – engineer
John Porter – producer, mixing
Jim Porto – photography
John Wells – cover model
Kelly Wholford, Jen Wyler – assistant engineers
Colin Young – illustrations

External links 
Official moe. website

1996 albums